Denizci is a Turkish surname literally meaning "sailor". Notable people with the surname include:

Ali Kemal Denizci (born 1950), Turkish football player and manager
Osman Denizci (born 1957), Turkish football player and manager

Turkish-language surnames